Jean-Yves Bosseur (born in Paris, 5 February 1947) is a French composer and writer.

Bosseur studied composition with Henri Pousseur and Karlheinz Stockhausen at the Third, Fourth, and Fifth Cologne Courses for New Music, from 1965 to 1968, at the Hochschule für Musik Köln, and received a doctorate in aesthetic philosophy from the University of Paris. He has composed more than 200 works and is most noteworthy for his stage works and chamber music.

Bibliography
 Bosseur, Jean-Yves. 1998. Vocabulaire des arts plastiques du XXe siècle. Paris: Minerve. .
 Bosseur, Jean-Yves. 2013. Compositeur parmi les peintres. Collection Musique/Transversales. Sampzon: Editions Delatour France. .

References

External links
Profile, The Living Composers Project

1947 births
Living people
French classical composers
French male classical composers
20th-century classical composers
21st-century classical composers
Hochschule für Musik und Tanz Köln alumni
Lycée Pasteur (Neuilly-sur-Seine) alumni
Pupils of Karlheinz Stockhausen
20th-century French composers
21st-century French composers
20th-century French male musicians
21st-century French male musicians